Wing Commander Peter Stanley James,  (24 February 1917 – 11 January 1999) was a pilot in the Royal Air Force Volunteer Reserve during the Second World War, flying in RAF Bomber Command with No. 35 Squadron, No. 78 Squadron and No. 148 Squadron.

James was captain of Handley Page Halifax L9500 (TL-H) during a daylight raid against the German battleship , flew in all three thousand bomber raids and was one of the first pilots to take the Handley Page Halifax into battle. James was awarded the Distinguished Flying Cross in 1941.

Early life and career
James was born in Wellingborough, Northamptonshire, on 24 February 1917, the son of Peter Octavius James and Mabel Whitton James.

He lived with his family in Wollaston, Northamptonshire and attended Wellingborough School from 1928 to 1933 before joining Nicholson Sons and Daniel Ltd., a local tannery based in Little Irchester, in late 1933. 

On 14 April 1938, James joined the RAF VR as a Sergeant (pupil) pilot and began ab-initio flying training at Sywell Aerodrome in Northamptonshire – flying the de Havilland Tiger Moth, Hawker Hart, Hawker Hind and Hawker Audax aircraft. Upon graduation, James was posted to No. 2 Service Flying Training School at RAF Brize Norton in Oxfordshire, for multi-engine training on the Airspeed Oxford, being awarded his RAF Flying Badge on 20 June 1940.
In August 1940, James joined No. 10 Operational Training Unit at RAF Abingdon, Oxfordshire where he began Medium bomber conversion training, flying the twin engine Armstrong Whitworth Whitley.

Upon successful completion of his training, James was promoted to Pilot Officer and posted to No. 78 Squadron, an operational unit, flying the Armstrong Whitworth Whitley, based at RAF Dishforth, Yorkshire.

Between 27 October 1940 and 11 February 1941, James took part in 15 operations over occupied territory.
These included trips to Hamm and Duisburg in the Ruhr, the ports of Lorient and Wilhelmshaven, and the city of Bremen, when, on the return leg, after 11 hours flying and with the loop aerial and port exactor unserviceable, James ordered his crew to bail out – all landing safely in South Molton, Devon.
James also took part in Operation Abigail Rachel in which 200 bombers attacked the city of Mannheim in retaliation for the Luftwaffe attacks on Southampton and Coventry.
An additional raid to Italy on 8/9 November 1940 was aborted when a Junkers Ju 88 of the Luftwaffe dropped a stick of bombs along the length of the flare path as four Armstrong Whitworth Whitleys, including James's aircraft, were waiting to take off at RAF Honington, Suffolk.

During his time with No. 78 Squadron James flew with Wing Commander (later Air Commodore) John Nicholas Haworth Whitworth, CB, DSO, DFC and Bar, who was to become the station commander at RAF Scampton during Operation Chastise, 617 Squadron's raid on the Edersee, Möhne and Sorpe dams.

On 5 March 1941, James was posted to No. 35 Squadron, based at RAF Linton-on-Ouse, Yorkshire and
began immediate conversion onto the Handley Page Halifax, flying circuits and landings in the prototype aircraft, serial number L7244.
During his time with No. 35 Squadron, James took part in 16 operations over occupied territory, including the first three Handley Page Halifax operations of the war, the bombing of the Leuna oil plant south of Merseburg and a daylight raid on the German battleship  in port at La Rochelle. James's posting to No. 35 Squadron also included an attachment to No. 2 Beam Approach Training Flight (B.A.T.F) based at RAF Driffield, Yorkshire.

On 11 August 1941, James was posted to No. 28 (Heavy) Conversion Flight at RAF Leconfield, Yorkshire where he became an instructor operating under the command of Squadron Leader (later Group Captain) James Brian ‘Willie’ Tait DSO and three bars, DFC and bar.

On 12 February 1942, James was promoted to acting Flying Officer and took up an instructors post with the newly formed No. 35 Squadron (Heavy) Conversion Flight.
During his time with No. 35 Conversion Flight, James again flew with Wing Commander John Whitworth, in addition to Squadron Leader James Tait.
Amongst the pupils under his tutorage was Pilot Officer Donald P. McIntyre of the Royal Canadian Air Force.
On 27 April 1942, whilst flying Halifax W1048 TL-S, McIntyre and his crew took part on a raid against the German battleship . During the bombing run, his aircraft was hit by anti-aircraft (AA) fire and despite an extensive fire which engulfed the starboard wing, skilfully managed to land the stricken aircraft onto the frozen lake Hoklingen, Norway.
W1048 was salvaged on 30 June 1973 by an RAF sub aqua team and members of the Draugen Diving Club and is on permanent display in the Bomber Hall of the Royal Air Force Museum, Hendon.

After a brief spell as Officer Commanding of No. 35 Conversion Flight, James was promoted to Squadron Leader and in April 1942 moved to become Office Commanding No. 78 Conversion Flight based at RAF Croft, Yorkshire. Whilst on attachment to this unit, James flew Halifax 2, serial no. R9434, with Wing Commander (later Air Vice-Marshall) E J Corbally on board to RAF Colerne, Wiltshire, to demonstrate the aircraft to members of the Air Ministry and War Chiefs of Staff.

On 30 May 1942, James flew Halifax L9624 with Pilot Officer Mitchener and a crew composed of No. 78 Conversion Flight students, taking part in the first thousand-bomber raid to Cologne.
The same crew accompanied James on the second thousand-bomber raid to Essen on 1 June 1942 and on 25 June 1942 James flew his last operation of the war, the third thousand-bomber raid to Bremen.

Following further instructional postings at No. 10 flying instructors school in Reading and as Flight Commander at No. 6 Elementary Flying Training School (E.F.T.S.) at Sywell, James was posted to the headquarters of number 50 ‘Training’ group, the Air staff where he held the position of ‘Air 2’.
Other instructional positions followed before a posting to the directing staff at No. 2 Officers Advanced Training school in Malta, flying the Douglas C-47 Skytrain, Vickers Wellington and Avro Anson.
In August 1945, James joined number 148 squadron at Foggia, Italy, as Officer Commanding ‘B’ flight flying the Consolidated B-24 Liberator where he took part in Air Trooping sorties, and Bulls eye exercises, analysing the effectiveness of radar vectored fighter intercepts onto large bomber formations.

Scharnhorst
Fifteen aircraft in total were detailed for the attack with nine from No. 35 Squadron and 6 from No. 76 Squadron.

Report taken from No. 35 Squadron Operational log.

Halifax L9500 – H

F/O James
Sgt Scott
Sgt Sewell
F/Sgt Rogers
Sgt Cox
Sgt Sachs
Sgt McQuigg

Distinguished Flying Cross
The announcement for the decoration was published in the London Gazette on 24 October 1941. His citation reads:

Thousand-bomber raids

Extracts taken from the book The Thousand Plan: The Story of the First Thousand Bomber Raid on Cologne by Ralph Barker

Operations and remarks

Memoria
Aspects of James operational career are on display in two UK museums, including a photograph and fragments of Whitley P4937 at the South Molton and District museum, Devon and uniform and other artefacts at the Sywell Aviation Museum in Northamptonshire.

Legacy
On 21 May 1946 James was appointed Officer Commanding No. 378 (Mannock) Squadron, Air Training Corps, a post he held until 15 March 1949 when he was appointed Officer Commanding Northamptonshire and Huntingdonshire Wing Air Training Corps. James was awarded the Cadet Forces Medal in November 1958.
During his time as wing commander, James was involved in the acquisition of land for several of the counties Air Training Corps Squadrons including 1101 Squadron, Kettering.
James held this post for the following 17 years until the amalgamation of the Northamptonshire wing with the Leicestershire Wing in 1966 when he stepped down, becoming chairman of No. 378 (Mannock) Squadron civilian committee.

Footnotes

References

 
 
 

1917 births
1999 deaths
British aviators
Royal Air Force wing commanders
Royal Air Force Volunteer Reserve personnel of World War II
Royal Air Force pilots of World War II
British World War II bomber pilots
Recipients of the Distinguished Flying Cross (United Kingdom)
People from Wollaston, Northamptonshire
People educated at Wellingborough School